Patrimonio Nacional is a Spanish autonomous agency, under the jurisdiction of the Ministry of the Presidency, that administers the sites owned by the Spanish State and used by the Monarch and the Spanish Royal Family as residences and for State Ceremonies. The Patrimonio Nacional includes palaces, gardens, monasteries and convents, called the Royal sites. When not in official use, the Royal sites are open to the public. It also manages the official and holiday residences of the Prime Minister.

The agency was first created in 1865 during the reign of Isabella II under the name of Patrimonio de la Corona (. During the reign of her grandson, Alfonso XIII, it was also known as Patrimonio Real. The second republic (1931–1939) kept the agency under the name of Patrimonio de la República  and in 1940, dictator Francisco Franco renamed it to Patrimonio National, the current name.

Patrimonio Nacional organizes temporary exhibitions and concerts in the Royal sites. It also publishes catalogues of the Royal Collections, books on the Royal sites, facsimiles of some of the books held in the library of El Escorial and the Royal Library, visitors guides to the different sites as well as the official photographs of the King of Spain. It also publishes a quarterly magazine, Reales Sitios, about the art collections and cultural history of the Royal sites.

The Royal Family has other palaces but these are not controlled by Patrimonio Nacional.

Royal Places

Royal Palaces 

 Royal Palace of Madrid (Madrid).
 Casita del Príncipe or Casita de Abajo (El Escorial)
 Casita del Príncipe (El Pardo)
 Casita del Infante (San Lorenzo de El Escorial).
 Royal Palace of Zarzuela (Madrid)
 Royal Site of San Lorenzo de El Escorial (San Lorenzo de El Escorial).
 Royal Palace of Aranjuez and his royal gardens and buildings (Aranjuez).
 Casa del Labrador (Aranjuez).
 Royal Palace of El Pardo (Madrid).
 Royal Palace of La Granja de San Ildefonso and all the royal buildings attached. (Real Sitio de San Ildefonso).
 Royal Palace of Riofrío (Real Sitio de San Ildefonso).
 Royal Palace of La Almudaina (Palma).
 Residencia Real de La Mareta (Teguise).

Royal convents and monasteries 
 Royal Convent of Las Descalzas Reales (Madrid).
 Monastery of Yuste (Cuacos de Yuste).
 Royal Monastery of the Incarnation (Madrid).
 Royal Monastery of Santa Isabel (Madrid).
 Royal Convent of Santa Clara (Tordesillas).
 Abbey of Santa Maria la Real de Huelgas (Burgos).
 Royal Convent of San Pascual  (Aranjuez).
 Colegio de Doncellas Nobles (Toledo).
 Benedictine Abbey of Santa Cruz del Valle de los Caídos (San Lorenzo de El Escorial).
 Pantheon of Illustrious Men (Madrid)

Residences of the Prime Minister 
 Palace of Moncloa (Madrid)
 Palace of Las Marismillas (Almonte)
 Coto Nacional de los Quintos de Mora (Los Yébenes)

Museum 
In addition to the exhibitions that Patrimonio Nacional carries out in the different Royal Sites, the agency will open a museum in 2023, the Royal Collections Gallery, destined to exhibit the heritage accumulated by the Spanish Monarchy for centuries.

The Board 
The National Heritage is managed by the Board of Directors of the agency which, according to Act 23/1982, is composed by a Chairperson and a Manager appointed by the Monarch, with the advice of the Prime Minister; and thirteen members of renowned reputation, including two city councilors of towns where properties of Patrimonio Nacional are located (currently the cities of Madrid and Palma) and two members from museums and cultural institutions of recognized prestige and international projection.

Structure 
The agency is structured through a central and a decentralized one:

The central structure is integrated by:

 The Administration and Resources Directorate.
 The Royal Collections Directorate.
 The Real Estate and Natural Environment Directorate.
 The Official and Cultural Events Directorate.

The territorial or decentralized structure is integrated by the Board' delegations in palaces, monasteries and other properties and organizations.

See also
 Crown Estate

References

External links 
 Official webpage

Spanish monarchy
Government agencies of Spain
1865 establishments in Spain